Ignatievka Cave (Ignateva cave, Ignatievskaya cave, also known as Yamazy-Tash) is a large limestone cave on the banks of the Sim River, a tributary of the Belaya river in the southern Ural Mountains of Russia. In 1980 a parietal wall painting of a female figure was discovered. The twenty-eight red dots between her legs are believed to represent the female menstrual cycle.

The cave also contains microliths, remains of animals and more cave paintings, as well as a stratum of Iron Age settlement. Although some sources associate the paintings to the Upper Paleolithic, the age of the drawings continues to be debated. The radiocarbon dating of the charcoal drawings has resulted in more recent numbers, between 6,000 and 8,000 years ago. The attempt to date the red pigment of the female figure yielded no result. In this respect, the age of the drawings remains unclear so far.

The track to the cave is very rough and has not been improved for years. The local guide from Serpiyevka noted that the cave was not lived in (there were no fire markings), but hypothesized that it was a sacred site mainly used for religious ceremonies and adulthood rites from the markings.

References 

Caves of Russia
Limestone caves
Caves containing pictograms
Landforms of Chelyabinsk Oblast
Archaeological sites in Russia